Bahram Soroush, is a UK-based civil rights activist  and a member of the Worker-Communist Party of Iran Central Committee.

Biography 
As a teenager, Soroush took part in demonstrations against the regime of the Shah during the Iranian Revolution (1978–79). He and his fellow secularist progressive protesters were surprised and disappointed that the Islamists managed to take hold of the revolution and turn the Westernised Imperial State of Iran into an Islamic republic.

In June 2007, Soroush became one of the co-founders of the Council of Ex-Muslims of Britain (CEMB).

Views 
According to Soroush, it is "very difficult to try to separate Islam from Islamic terrorist organisations". In a conference held in June 2006, Bahram said that the "Iranian government is antiworker and anti-human"  Soroush has said that the Islamic Republic is not a representative of the Iranian people and that it would be dangerous for the Republic to attain nuclear weapons.

In Soroush's view, the term Islamophobia is being used to "stifle the criticism of Islam" and that "considering the atrocities" committed by Islamic movements, terrorist attacks and honour killings in Muslim countries, it is "understandable that people should have a dislike of Islam and that this negative perception of Islam should have grown".

References

External links
Two thumbs down - Transcript of TV interview with Bahram Soroush aired on TV International English, a channel owned by Worker-Communist Party of Iran
A fresh breeze in the labour movement in Iran - transcript of a TV International interview conducted by Fariborz Pooya (March 7, 2005)
 Picture of Soroush as a protester in the Iraqi opposition conference - Another picture
 UK: Mayor of London, political Islam and us - Transcript of Interview with Bahram Soroush and Fariborz Pooya (25/05/2005)

Iranian activists
Year of birth missing (living people)
Living people
Place of birth missing (living people)
Former Muslim critics of Islam
British critics of Islam
Former Muslims turned agnostics or atheists